Świerczyniec is a village in the administrative district of Gmina Bojszowy, within Bieruń-Lędziny County, Silesian Voivodeship, in southern Poland.

The village has a population of 973.

References

Villages in Bieruń-Lędziny County